The American Peace Society is a pacifist group founded upon the initiative of William Ladd, in New York City, May 8, 1828. It was formed by the merging of many state and local societies, from New York, Maine, New Hampshire, and Massachusetts, of which the oldest, the New York Peace Society, dated from 1815. Ladd was an advocate of a "Congress and High Court of Nations." The society organized peace conferences and regularly published a periodical entitled Advocate of Peace.
The Society was only opposed to wars between nation states; it did not oppose the American Civil War,
regarding the Union's war as a "police action" against the "criminals" of
the Confederacy. 
  Its most famous leader was Benjamin Franklin Trueblood (1847–1916), a Quaker who in his book The Federation of the World (1899) called for the establishment of an international state to bring about lasting peace in the world. In 1834 the headquarters of the society were removed to Hartford, in 1834 to Boston, Massachusetts, in 1911 to Washington, D.C.  The group is now based in Washington. Its official journal is World Affairs.

The American Peace Society house, its headquarters from 1911 to 1948 near the White House, is a U.S. National Historic Landmark.
The American Peace Society was opposed to Zionism.

History
In 1833, their office was listed as 129 Nassau Street in New York City, NY. As of 1834 the society operated from headquarters on Wall Street in New York City. In Boston it worked from offices on Cornhill (ca.1840s–1850s); Chauncey Street (ca.1864); Winter Street (ca.1868–1869); and Somerset Street (ca.1870s–1890s). Annual meetings took place in various venues in Boston, including Park Street Church (1851). Officers included George C. Beckwith, William Jay, Howard Malcom, John Field, William C. Brown.

Notable people
 Ruth Hinshaw Spray (1848–1929), served as vice-president for 16 years

See also
 Pacifism in the United States
 List of anti-war organizations
 List of peace activists
 Massachusetts Peace Society (1815–1828), one of the predecessors to the American Peace Society
 White House Peace Vigil

Footnotes

Oxford Dictionary of the U.S. Military. Oxford University Press, 2001
Dictionary of American History by James Truslow Adams, New York: Charles Scribner's Sons, 1940

Further reading

Issued by the society
 Advocate of Peace. Published in Hartford: v.1-2 (1834–1836). Published in Boston:  v.3-4 (1839–1842); v.11 (1854). New series v.7-9 (1876–1878). Published in Washington, DC: v.84 (1922). Also called Advocate of Peace Through Justice
 via HathiTrust; also here and here
 Thomas Hancock. The principles of peace: exemplified in the conduct of the Society of Friends in Ireland, during the rebellion of the year 1798, with some preliminary and concluding observations. 1843
 Walter Channing. Thoughts on peace and war: An address delivered before the American Peace Society at its annual meeting, May 27, 1844.
 The Book of Peace. Boston: George Beckwith, 1845.
 William Jay. An address delivered before the American Peace Society at its annual meeting, May 26, 1845.
 Charles Sumner. The war system of the commonwealth of nations: an address before the American Peace Society, at its anniversary in Boston, May 28, 1849.  1854. Internet Archive
 Rufus W. Clark. An address delivered before the American Peace Society at its annual meeting, May 26, 1851.
 Angel of Peace. v.5-8 (1876–1878). Children's magazine.

About the society
 The Calumet. v.2 (1834–1835)
  James Libby Tryon. The Rise of the Peace Movement. Yale Law Journal, Vol. 20, No. 5 (Mar., 1911), pp. 358–371
 The American Peace Society: A Centennial History by Edson L. Whitney (1928)

External links

 American Peace Society Website
 American Peace Society Records, 1828–1947, housed at the Swarthmore College Peace Collection
 Library of Congress. Photo of Philip Marshall Brown of the American Peace Society, Washington, D.C., May 1, 1939. Harris & Ewing, photographer
 Literature from the antebellum American peace movement

Peace organizations based in the United States
1828 establishments in New York (state)
19th century in Boston
Organizations based in Boston
Organizations based in Washington, D.C.
Anti-Zionist organizations